The Battle of South Shanxi , also known as the Battle of Jinnan and Zhongtiao Mountains campaign by the Chinese and as the Chungyuan Operation by the Japanese, was one of the 22 major engagements between the National Revolutionary Army and the Imperial Japanese Army during the Second Sino-Japanese War (1937–1945).

At the onset of the battle, KMT-CPC relations were at a low point following the still recent New Fourth Army incident in early 1941. As a result, the nearby 8th Route Army refused to assist the surrounded Nationalists. South Shanxi would later be remembered in China as one of the worst defeats of the entire war.

References

South Shanxi
Suixian-Zaoyang 1939
1941 in China
1941 in Japan
Military history of Shanxi
May 1941 events